Cantenac is a former commune in the Gironde department in Nouvelle-Aquitaine in southwestern France. On 1 January 2017, it was merged into the new commune Margaux-Cantenac. It is located near Bordeaux.

Population

Wine
Situated on the Left bank of the Gironde in the region Haut-Médoc, the area is home to many wineries, however following a law of 1954, Cantenac wines fall under the Margaux AOC, as there is no appreciable difference between the two communes. The chateaux of Cantenac that were ranked at the Bordeaux Wine Official Classification of 1855 are:

Château Brane-Cantenac
Château Kirwan
Château d'Issan
Château Palmer
Château Boyd-Cantenac
Château Cantenac-Brown
Château Prieuré-Lichine
Château Pouget

See also
Bordeaux wine regions
Communes of the Gironde department

References

External links

 Cantenac-Margaux wine information

Former communes of Gironde